Girardia dorotocephala is a species of dugesiid triclad native to North America.<ref>*Tyler S, Schilling S, Hooge M, and Bush LF (comp.) (2006-2012) Turbellarian taxonomic database. Version 1.7  Database</ref> It has been accidentally introduced in Japan. Girardia dorotocephala'' is cannibalistic, which led to its usage in memory transfer experiments.

References

Dugesiidae